Aa en Hunze is a municipality in the northeastern Netherlands.

The names 'Aa' (more precisely the 'Drentsche Aa') and 'Hunze' refer to two small rivers through the municipality.

Population centres

Transportation
There is no railway station in the municipality. The nearest station is Assen railway station.

Bus services
 21: Assen - Deurze - Rolde - Grolloo - Schoonloo - Emmen 
 24: Assen - Deurze - Rolde - Papenvoort - Borger - Buinen - Buinerveen - Nieuw-Buinen - Stadskanaal 
 59: Emmen - Borger - Gasselte - Gieten
 Buurtbus 93: Gieten - De Hilte - Eexterveen - Annerveen - Spijkerboor - Annen - Spijkerboor - Zuidlaren 
 Buurtbus 94: Gieten - De Hilte - Gieterveen - Bonnerveen - Gasselterboerveen - Gasselternijveen - Drouwenerveen - Drouwenermond - Stadskanaal 
 110: Assen - Deurze - Rolde - Gieten - De Hilte - Bareveld - Veendam 
 Qliner 300: Groningen - Gieten - Borger - Emmen (express) 
 Qliner 312: Groningen - Gieten - Gasselte - Gasselternijveen - Stadskanaal (express)

Notable people 

 Harm Brouwer (born 1957) politician
 Wim Cool (born 1943) business consultant, mediator and politician
 Hessel de Vries (1916–1959) physicist concerned with radiocarbon dating, also a murderer
 Jan Dijkema (born 1944) politician, sociologist and sports director
 Gerrit Oosting (1941–2012) politician

Sport 

 Berden de Vries (born 1989) racing cyclist and former speed skater
 Janneke Ensing (born 1986) cyclist
 Arnold van Calker (born 1976) bobsledder
 Edwin van Calker (born 1979) bobsledder
 Alida van der Anker-Doedens (1922–2014) sprint canoeist, competed in two Summer Olympics

Gallery

References

External links

 
Municipalities of Drenthe
Municipalities of the Netherlands established in 1998